The 2016 Reigate and Banstead Borough Council election took place on 5 May 2016 to elect members of Reigate and Banstead Borough Council in England. This was on the same day as other local elections.

Election result
The composition of the council after the election was:
Conservative: 39 
Reigate and Banstead Residents Association: 7
Green Party of England and Wales: 2 
Liberal Democrat: 2
UKIP: 1

Ward results

Banstead Village

Chipstead, Hooley and Woodmansterne

Earlswood and Whitebushes

Horley Central

Horley East

Horley West

Kingswood with Burgh Heath

Meadvale and St John’s

Merstham

Nork

Redhill East

Redhill West

Reigate Central

Reigate Hill

South Park and Woodhatch

Tadworth and Walton

Tattenhams

References

2016 English local elections
2016
2010s in Surrey